Blood is a peer-reviewed medical journal published by the American Society of Hematology. It was established by William Dameshek in 1946. The journal changed from semimonthly (24 times annually) to weekly publication at the start of 2009. It covers clinical and basic research in all areas of hematology, including disorders of leukocytes, both benign and malignant, erythrocytes, platelets, hemostatic mechanisms, vascular biology, immunology, and hematologic oncology.

Abstracting and indexing 
Blood is indexed and abstracted by:

According to the Journal Citation Reports, the journal has a 2021 impact factor of 25.476, and has a Journal Impact Factor rank of 1/76 in the Hematology category.

References

External links 
 

Publications established in 1946
Hematology journals
English-language journals
Weekly journals
Academic journals published by learned and professional societies of the United States